James Richardson (born January 1, 1950) is an American poet.

Career and education
James Richardson is an American poet and critic. He is a retired Professor of English & Creative Writing at Princeton University, where he had taught since 1980. He grew up in Garden City, New York and attended Princeton University, graduating summa cum laude in 1971. He earned his Ph.D. from the University of Virginia in 1975.

Richardson is the author of several collections of poetry, criticism, and aphorisms, and has been awarded or nominated for some of the top awards in American literature, including the Jackson Poetry Prize, the National Book Award, and the National Book Critics Circle Award.

His work has appeared in multiple editions of The Best American Poetry, and in publications including The New Yorker, Paris Review, and Slate.

Awards

 Award in Literature from the American Academy of Arts and Letters
 Robert H. Winner Award, Poetry Society of America
 Cecil Hemley Award, Poetry Society of America
 Emily Dickinson Award, Poetry Society of America
 NEH Fellowship
 New Jersey State Council on the Arts Fellowship
 1991 National Poetry Series
 National Book Critics Circle Award finalist, for Interglacial: New and Selected Poems and Aphorisms
 2010 National Book Award finalist for By the Numbers
 2011 Jackson Poetry Prize (awarded by Poets & Writers)

Bibliography

Poetry
Collections
 
 
 
 
 
 
 
List of poems

Aphorisms

Criticism

Appearances in anthologies

References

External links

"End of Summer", The New Yorker, September 3, 2007
"In Shakespeare", The New Yorker, February 12, 2007
"Subject, Verb, Object", The New Yorker, December 3, 2007

1950 births
Living people
American male poets
The New Yorker people
Princeton University faculty
Princeton University alumni